Leoncio Prado may refer to:

Places
 Leoncio Prado Province, a province in the Huánuco Region of Peru
 Leoncio Prado District, Huaura, a district of the Huaura province, Peru
 Leoncio Prado District, Lucanas, a district of the Lucanas province, Peru

People
 Leoncio Prado Gutiérrez (1853–1883), Peruvian mariner